Ivica Zubac (born 18 March 1997) is a Croatian professional basketball player for the Los Angeles Clippers of the National Basketball Association (NBA). He was drafted by the Los Angeles Lakers in the second round in the 2016 NBA draft. He played for the Lakers until the 2019 trade deadline when he was traded to the Clippers. During the 2021 NBA Playoffs, he helped the Los Angeles Clippers reach the Western Conference Finals for the first time in franchise history.

Professional career

Europe (2013–2016)
Zubac came through the youth system of Cibona and then played for Zrinjevac in the second Croatian division during the 2013–14 season. He made the roster of Cibona's men's team the following season, becoming a part of a group of prospects including Nik Slavica and Ante Žižić after the departure of Dario Šarić. He played in Croatia's top-tier level A-1 League and the ABA League his first year, and also saw action in the FIBA Europe Cup his second year. In February 2016, he left Cibona because of the financial difficulties of the team, and signed with Mega Leks of Serbia.

Los Angeles Lakers (2016–2019)

On 23 June 2016, Zubac was selected with the 32nd overall pick in the 2016 NBA draft by the Los Angeles Lakers. On 7 July, he signed with the Lakers and joined the team for the 2016 NBA Summer League. Zubac made his NBA debut on 2 November 2016, scoring six points as the fill-in starter for Timofey Mozgov, as the Lakers defeated the Atlanta Hawks 123–116. After appearing in only 10 NBA games over the first half of the season, Zubac had a season-best game on 17 January 2017 against the Denver Nuggets. He put together his first double-double, scoring 11 points and pulling down a team-high 13 rebounds. He also had three blocked shots in the 127–121 loss. On 12 March 2017, he had 10 points, six rebounds and a season-high four blocked shots in a 118–116 loss to the Philadelphia 76ers. The following night, he had a season-best game with a career-best 25 points on 12-of-15 shooting to go with 11 rebounds in a 129–101 loss to the Denver Nuggets. On 31 March 2017, he was ruled out for the rest of the season with a high ankle sprain in his right ankle. During his rookie season, Zubac had multiple assignments with the Los Angeles D-Fenders, the Lakers' D-League affiliate.

During the 2017–18 season, Zubac had multiple assignments with the South Bay Lakers, the Lakers' NBA G League affiliate due to limited playing time in the regular season.

On 17 January 2019, Zubac scored a career-high 26 points along with 12 rebounds including a career-high 6 offensive rebounds against the Oklahoma City Thunder in a 138–128 overtime win.

Los Angeles Clippers (2019–present) 
On 7 February 2019, Zubac and Michael Beasley were traded to the Los Angeles Clippers in exchange for Mike Muscala. Zubac became a key member for the Clippers during the final stretch of the season, eventually reaching the playoffs for the first time in his career with them.

On 22 February 2020, Zubac posted a season-high 15 rebounds in 20 minutes of play against the Sacramento Kings. In a win over the Houston Rockets, Zubac shot a perfect 6 for 6 from the field and made a season-high 17 points, while also collecting 12 rebounds and blocking 1 shot on 5 March.
On 6 August 2020, Zubac posted 21 points and 15 rebounds on 100% shooting in 24 minutes on the court in the 126–111 win against the Dallas Mavericks. This made Zubac the first player in the shot clock era to accomplish 20+ points and 15+ rebounds on 100% shooting in under 30 minutes’ play time.

On 15 February 2021, Zubac scored a season high 22 points, alongside grabbing 8 rebounds, in a 125-118 win over the Miami Heat. On 14 April, Zubac recorded a double-double with 18 points and 13 rebounds in a 100-98 win over the Detroit Pistons.

On 19 January 2022, Zubac scored a career-high 32 points and grabbed 10 rebounds during a 130-128 overtime loss against the Denver Nuggets. During the 2021-22 NBA season as a whole, Zubac started a career-high 76 games and averaged career-highs of 10.3 points and 8.5 rebounds per game.

On 28 June 2022, Zubac signed a three-year, $33 million contract extension with the Clippers. On 27 November, put up 31 points and a career-high 29 rebounds in a 114–110 win over the Indiana Pacers.

National team career
Zubac represented the Croatian junior national team during the 2013 FIBA Europe Under-16 Championship. He averaged 17.6 points and 7.9 rebounds a contest during the 2015 FIBA Under-19 World Championship in Greece, while receiving All-World Championship Under-19 Second Team honors from the European basketball website eurobasket.com. Zubac averaged double digits in scoring (15.8 points per game) and rebounding (12.9 rebounds per game), to go along with 3.0 blocks per game at the 2015 FIBA Europe Under-18 Championship, while making the all-tournament second team (as selected by eurobasket.com).

NBA career statistics

Regular season

|-
| style="text-align:left;"| 
| style="text-align:left;"| L.A. Lakers
| 38 || 11 || 16.0 || .529 || .000 || .653 || 4.2 || .8 || .4 || .9 || 7.5
|-
| style="text-align:left;"| 
| style="text-align:left;"| L.A. Lakers
| 43 || 0 || 9.5 || .500 || .000 || .765 || 2.8 || .6 || .2 || .3 || 3.7
|-
| style="text-align:left;" rowspan=2| 
| style="text-align:left;"| L.A. Lakers
| 33 || 12 || 15.6 || .580 || — || .864 || 4.9 || .8 || .1 || .8 || 8.5
|-
| style="text-align:left;"| L.A. Clippers
| 26 || 25 || 20.2 || .538 || — || .733 || 7.7 || 1.5 || .4 || .9 || 9.4
|-
| style="text-align:left;"| 
| style="text-align:left;"| L.A. Clippers
| 72 || 70 || 18.4 || .613  || .000 || .747 || 7.5 || 1.1 || .2 || .9 || 8.3
|-
| style="text-align:left;"| 
| style="text-align:left;"| L.A. Clippers
| style="background:#cfecec;"|  72* || 33 || 22.3 || .652 || .250 || .789 || 7.2 || 1.3 || .3 || .9 || 9.0
|-
| style="text-align:left;"| 
| style="text-align:left;"| L.A. Clippers
| 76 || 76 || 24.4 || .626 || — || .727 || 8.5 || 1.6 || .5 || 1.0 || 10.3
|- class="sortbottom"
| style="text-align:center;" colspan="2"| Career
| 360 || 227 || 19.0 || .597 || .100 || .754 || 6.5 || 1.1 || .3 || .8 || 8.3

Playoffs

|-
| style="text-align:left;"| 2019
| style="text-align:left;"| L.A. Clippers
| 4 || 3 || 9.8 || .500 || — || .667 || 5.5 || .3 || .5 || .5 || 5.0
|-
| style="text-align:left;"| 2020
| style="text-align:left;"| L.A. Clippers
| 13 || 13 || 24.6 || .564 || — || .811 || 7.2 || .6 || .2 || .8 || 9.1
|-
| style="text-align:left;"| 2021
| style="text-align:left;"| L.A. Clippers
| 17 || 7 || 17.7 || .596 || — || .796 || 5.8 || .4 || .1 || .7 || 6.3
|-class="sortbottom"
| style="text-align:center;" colspan="2"| Career 
| 34 || 23 || 19.4 || .569 || — || .798 || 6.3 || .5 || .2 || .7 || 7.2

Personal life
Zubac was born in Mostar and grew up in Čitluk in Bosnia and Herzegovina, just east of the Croatian border. He is a Croatian citizen. Former NBA player Zoran Planinić is his cousin.

See also

 List of European basketball players in the United States
 List of foreign basketball players in Serbia
 List of NBA drafted players from Serbia

References

External links

 Ivica Zubac at fiba.com

1997 births
Living people
ABA League players
Basketball League of Serbia players
Bosnia and Herzegovina expatriate basketball people in Serbia
Bosnia and Herzegovina expatriate basketball people in the United States
Centers (basketball)
Croatian expatriate basketball people in Serbia
Croatian expatriate basketball people in the United States
Croatian men's basketball players
Croats of Bosnia and Herzegovina
KK Cibona players
KK Mega Basket players
KK Zrinjevac players
Los Angeles Clippers players
Los Angeles D-Fenders players
Los Angeles Lakers draft picks
Los Angeles Lakers players
National Basketball Association players from Croatia
People from Čitluk, Bosnia and Herzegovina
South Bay Lakers players
Basketball players from Mostar